Blacks Fork, also known as Blacks Fork Commissary, is a ghost town in Summit County, Utah, United States. Named for the Blacks Fork River, it was a logging town that operated from 1870 to 1930.

History
Blacks Fork was established in 1870 as a logging camp that supplied lumber to the railroad and mining industries. A large barn was erected near the center of the town, and several businesses and homes were built around the barn. Tradition says that the town also served as a military commissary during the early part of its history, but Utah ghost towns researcher Stephen Carr concluded that "...this suggestion is very unlikely," citing the camp's remote location and harsh climate, as well as the fact that an army post called "Blacks Fork" already existed near Bryan, Wyoming. The population peaked at about 100, but the town was soon abandoned. Remaining are the barn, a post office, and a few homes.

See also

 List of ghost towns in Utah

References

External links

Ghost towns in Utah
Populated places established in 1870
1870 establishments in Utah Territory
Logging communities in the United States
Ghost towns in Summit County, Utah